Md Nazmul Haque Bappy is a Bangladeshi director, and painter. He has received several awards, including Berger Paints Award UNAIDS Grand Award, China Bangladesh Friendship Award, Grand Award in International Korean Art Festival, Award in Art Are-China Exhibition.

Early life 
Bappy was born on 27 December in Dhaka, Bangladesh. He completed BFA and MFA from the Department of Oriental Art, Faculty of Fine Art, University of Dhaka. Bappy had obtained a higher degree in Chinese painting with a fully funded scholarship from the Chinese government.

Career 
Bappy began his career as a director in Osomapto television drama in 2014. He is also a professional painter. He is performing as a Lecturer in Faculty of fine arts at University of Development Alternative.

Notable TV dramas and telefilms 
 Osomapto
 Akash Meghe Dhaka
 Bokarai Preme Pore
 Bhalobashi Ajo
 Tomay Niye
 Opekkha
Kotha Chilo
Ami Ovinoy Korini
Ami Tomar Akash Hobo
Chai Ronger Golpo

Solo painting exhibitions 
 2011 : Expression of freedom, Alliance Françoise de Dhaka
 2011 : Expression of freedom - 2,  Zainul Gallery, Faculty of Fine Arts, University of Dhaka
 2012 : Absorb Nature, Alliance Française de Dhaka
 2013 : The Oriental Life, Gallery Chitrak, Dhaka
 2013: Playing with Colors, Athena Gallery, University of Dhaka
 2014 : Nature & Beauty , Shijiazhuang , China
 2014 : Natural Rhythm, Hubei Normal University Museum, China
 2015: Nature , Shijiazhuang , China
 2017 : An Eternal Journey , Alliance Françoise de Dhaka

References

External links 
 
 
 

Living people
Bangladeshi film directors
Bangladeshi painters
Bangladeshi screenwriters
People from Dhaka District
University of Dhaka Faculty of Fine Arts alumni
Year of birth missing (living people)